Cools  is a Dutch patronymic surname meaning "son of Cool", Cool being an archaic nickname for Nicholas. The name is particularly prominent in the Belgian province of Antwerp. People with the surname include:

 Alexander Cools ( 1941–2013), Dutch behavioral pharmacologist
 André Cools (1927–1991), Belgian socialist politician
 Anne Cools (born 1943), Canadian social worker
 Dion Cools (born 1996), Malaysian-Belgian footballer
 Frans Cools (1918–1999), Belgian cyclist
 Jens Cools (born 1990), Belgian football player
 Julien Cools (born 1947), Belgian football player
  (1618–1706), Flemish Catholic bishop
 Roshan Cools (born 1975), Dutch neuroscientist
 Samantha Cools (born 1986), Canadian cyclist
 Sarah Cools (born 1997), Belgian volleyball player

References

See also
 Cool (surname)
 McCool (surname)

Dutch-language surnames
Surnames of Belgian origin
Patronymic surnames